Jacques-Nicolas Paillot de Montabert (1771–1849) was a French painter of the early 19th century. He painted scenes related to the rule of Napoleon I.

He is famous for the painting of Napoleon's Mamluk bodyguard, Roustam, painted in 1806.

References 

1771 births
1849 deaths
People from Troyes
18th-century French painters
French male painters
19th-century French painters
French art historians
19th-century French male artists
18th-century French male artists